The 56th Army was a field army of the Soviet Union's Red Army that was created in 1941, and then disbanded to create the second formation of the Separate Coastal Army in 1943. The 56th Army was employed by the Soviets in the struggle against Germany during World War II.

History 
The 56th Army was formed in October 1941 and subordinated to the North Caucasus Military District. Subordinated to the Southern Front (Soviet Union) in December 1941, the 56th Army was made up of the following units, as well as five regiments of artillery and a rocket-launcher regiment.

31st Rifle Division
106th Rifle Division
343rd Rifle Division
347th Rifle Division
353rd Rifle Division

11th Rifle Brigade
13th Rifle Brigade
16th Rifle Brigade
78th Rifle Brigade
33rd NKVD Motorized Rifle Regiment

62nd Cavalry Division
64th Cavalry Division
70th Cavalry Division
"NO" Cavalry Division
54th Tank Brigade
8th Tank Battalion

In January 1942 the army comprised the 31st, 106th, 343rd, and 347th Rifle Divisions, the 13th and 16th Rifle Brigades, the Rostov Separate Rifle Regiment of the People's Militia, and the 62nd, 64th, 70th Cavalry Divisions. 

Among prominent actions, the 56th Army fought during the successful Soviet liberation of Rostov in late 1941 and spearheaded the amphibious landings in the Crimea in late 1943. The 56th Army was disbanded in November 1943 to create the second formation of the Separate Coastal Army.

Commanders 
 Lieutenant General Fyodor Remezov (October 1941December 1941)
 Major General Viktor Tsyganov (December 1941July 1942) 
 Major General Alexander Ryzhov (July 1942January 1943) 
 Major General (promoted to Lieutenant General April 1943) Andrei Grechko (JanuaryOctober 1943) 
 Lieutenant General Kondrat Melnik (OctoberNovember 1943)

Notes

References 
 David Glantz, Companion to Colossus Reborn, University Press of Kansas, Lawrence, KS, 2005

Further reading 
 Keith Bonn, Slaughterhouse: The Handbook of the Eastern Front, Aberjona Press, Bedford, PA, 2005
 V.I. Feskov et al., The Soviet Army in the Period of the Cold War, Tomsk University Press, 2004
 Jean-Luc Marchand, Order of Battle Soviet Army World War 2, 24 volumes, The Nafziger Collection
 Samuel J. Newland and Clayton K. S. Chun, The European Campaign: Its Origins and Conduct, U.S. Army War College SSI, Carlisle, PA, 2011

Field armies of the Soviet Union
Military units and formations established in 1941
Military units and formations disestablished in 1943